Jagsthausen is a town in the district of Heilbronn in Baden-Württemberg in Germany. Roman Herzog died there.

References

External links
 

Heilbronn (district)